The President of the Illinois Senate is the presiding officer of the Illinois Senate, the upper house of the Illinois General Assembly. The post dates from the General Assembly's 32nd session, in 1881.

From 1881 to 1973, the lieutenant governor was constitutionally President of the Senate. The highest elected post in the chamber, until then, was known as president pro tempore, and presided over the body in the absence of the lieutenant governor. Since then, the Illinois Senate has elected its president from its membership. The president is sixth (behind the lieutenant governor, attorney general, secretary of state, comptroller, and treasurer, respectively) in the line of succession to the office of Governor of Illinois.

The colors indicate the political party affiliation of each presiding officer.

Ex officio presidents

Presidents pro tempore

Presidents

References

External links
 Illinois General Assembly - Senate official government site
 Illinois Blue Book 2009-10 official government document

Senate